Elías José Gómez (born 9 June 1994) is an Argentine professional footballer who plays as a left-back for River Plate.

Career
Gómez began his career with Rosario Central in the youth team, joining in 2006. Before starting his senior career with Rosario Central, he had a short loan spell with Sportivo Las Heras in 2013. He featured for the first time for Rosario Central on 23 November 2013 during a defeat away to Olimpo. He subsequently made sixteen appearances across the following three campaigns in all competitions. On 2 February 2016, Defensa y Justicia completed the loan signing of Gómez. He remained with the club for the 2016 and 2016–17 seasons, playing in twelve matches before returning to Rosario in June 2017.

In January 2019, Gómez joined fellow top-flight side Argentinos Juniors on loan. He scored his first senior goal on 18 February against Estudiantes. Twelve months after arriving, in January 2020, Argentinos purchased Gómez permanently as the defender signed a three-and-a-half year contract.

At the end of January 2022, Gómez joined River Plate on a deal until the end of 2025.

Career statistics
.

References

External links

1994 births
Living people
People from Rosario Department
Argentine footballers
Association football fullbacks
Primera Nacional players
Torneo Argentino B players
Argentine Primera División players
Rosario Central footballers
Defensa y Justicia footballers
Argentinos Juniors footballers
Club Atlético River Plate footballers
Sportspeople from Santa Fe Province